Kevin Dwight Daniels Jr. (born December 9, 1976 in San Diego, California), is an American actor who started his career with a supporting role in the 1998 film Twelfth Night, or What You Will by director Nicholas Hytner. He has appeared in the film Hollywood Homicide, as well as the TV series Law & Order, Frasier, Chuck, House and Modern Family, the latter in the recurring role of Longines. He has since participated in more than 20 productions. He is best known for playing Don Miller, a firefighter for the Baltimore City Fire Department in the movie Ladder 49 and the USA show Sirens where he played Hank St. Clare, a Chicago EMT.

He starred in the 2012 Broadway play Magic/Bird playing the lead role of Magic Johnson.

Daniels attended the Juilliard School as a member of the Drama Division's Group 27 (1994–1998).

Filmography

Film

Television

Videogames

Personal life
Daniels is openly gay.

References

External links
 

1976 births
Living people
American male film actors
American male television actors
Juilliard School alumni
Male actors from San Diego
African-American male actors
20th-century American male actors
21st-century American male actors
20th-century African-American people
21st-century African-American people
American gay actors
LGBT African Americans